Søre Bukkevatnet or Søndre Bukkevatnet is a lake in Narvik Municipality in Nordland county, Norway. Søre Bukkevannet is joined together with Nordre Bukkevatnet via a natural canal. The lake Geitvatnet lies immediately to the west of this lake.

See also
List of lakes in Norway

References

Ballangen
Lakes of Nordland